Yanga Baliso (born 27 March 1997) is a South African professional footballer who plays as a midfielder for AC Oulu.

Career 
In 2016, Baliso joined the youth academy of Orlando Pirates, one of South Africa's most successful clubs.

In 2018, he was sent on loan to Cape Umoya United in the South African second division, here he made 11 league appearances and scored 1 goal.

In 2019, Baliso signed for Finnish fourth division side Pargas IF.

Before the 2020 season, he signed for IFK Mariehamn in the Finnish top flight after trying to join a Swedish team.

References

External links 
 

Living people
1997 births
South African soccer players
Sportspeople from Cape Town
Association football midfielders
National First Division players
Veikkausliiga players
Kolmonen players
Cape Umoya United F.C. players
IFK Mariehamn players
South African expatriate soccer players
South African expatriates in Finland
Expatriate footballers in Finland
Pargas Idrottsförening players